Anchetil de Greye (c. 1046 – after 1086) was a Norman chevalier and vassal of William FitzOsbern, 1st Earl of Hereford, one of the great magnates of early Norman England.

He is regarded as the ancestor of the noble House of Grey, branches of which held many peerage and other titles in England, including Baron Grey de Wilton (1295), Baron Ferrers of Groby (1299), Baron Grey of Codnor (1299, 1397), Baron Grey de Ruthyn (1324), Earl of Tankerville (1419, 1695), Earl of Huntingdon (1471), Marquess of Dorset (1475), Baron Grey of Powis (1482), Duke of Suffolk (1551), Baronet Grey of Chillingham (1619); Baron Grey of Werke (1623/4), Earl of Stamford (1628), Viscount Glendale (1695), Baronet Grey of Howick (1746), Baron Walsingham (1780), Baron Grey of Howick (1801); Viscount Howick (1806), Earl Grey (1806), Baronet Grey of Fallodon (1814), etc., which married into the royal family and which continues to this day. Lady Jane Grey (c. 1537 – 1554) "the Nine Days' Queen", was a member of this family.

Landholdings

In his Latinised name of Anschtallus de Grai (an alternative spelling for Anschetillus) he is listed in the Domesday Book of 1086 as the lord of six Oxfordshire manors, all held from William FitzOsbern, 1st Earl of Hereford (c. 1020 – 1071), lord of the manor of Breteuil, in Normandy, a relative and close counsellor of William the Conqueror, whose chief residence was Carisbrooke Castle on the Isle of Wight, one of many English castles he built.
The manors held by Anchetil de Greye were as follows:
Black Bourton, Bampton hundred, Oxfordshire;
Brighthampton, Bampton hundred, Oxfordshire;
Rotherfield Greys, Binfield hundred, Oxfordshire;
Cornwell, Shipton hundred, Oxfordshire; 
Radford, Shipton hundred, Oxfordshire;
Woodleys, Wootton hundred, Oxfordshire;
The principal estate granted to Anchetil de Greye in England was Redrefield (subsequently Rotherfield Greys), the manor house of which is today represented by Greys Court, now in South Oxfordshire. Anchetil was also the tenant of Standlake, seemingly a part of Brighthampton.

Origins
Greye's origins in Normandy are unclear, although it is believed he came from the vicinity of today's Graye-sur-Mer (Calvados, Graieum 1086, Graia 1172, Gray 1183) which would have been within the domain of William I. There is also a possible connection to the eastern French town of Gray.

It is likely that Anchetil de Greye was of Norse ancestry in whole or in part since the given name Anchetil (from Ásketíll "God-Cauldron") was a fairly common Norse-origin name in Normandy. The "Greye" in his name then was either simply a reference to his estate, or to his mixed Scandinavian-Frankish ancestry which was also common in Normandy by the time of the invasion of England. His immediate ancestry is uncertain, but some researchers believe he was the son of a certain Hugh Fitz Turgis, that means "Turgis' son" (from Thorgisl "hostage of Thor"), another clue he was from Normandy.

More than 20 superficially distinct instances of Anschitil, Anschil, Anschetil, etc. in early Norman documents must refer to a far smaller number of distinct individuals. Particularly interesting is Anschitil de Ros. According to Domesday Monachorum he was the feudal landlord, under the Bishop of Bayeux, of Craie, another Craie, and Croctune (or Crawton). These three places are in the Cray valley of Kent, which was in Norman times the foremost site of chalk mining from deneholes, on a scale rivalled only by the Hangman's Wood cluster of deneholes on the other side of the Thames in Grays.

Cray and Grey seem to be almost interchangeable in Kent place names. Cray passed from Anglo-Norman French into English as a word for "chalk", while greye is one of the wide range of French regional dialect words for "chalk". Between them, on the river Seulles, at Orival near Creully, lies an ancient quarry where building stone is said to have been dug and lime burned since Gallo-Roman times. One of the key resources found in chalk mines is flint, which was used for tools, construction and making fire.

Whether Anschetil de Grai and Anschitil de Ros were two persons or one, they/he must have known about and profited from the digging and shipping of limestone in Normandy, so it is at least curious that they/he picked chalk-digging areas for their new feudal domains in England.

Descendants
He was the great-grandfather of John de Grey, Bishop of Norwich, and probably also of Henry de Grey, and the great-great-grandfather of Walter de Grey, Archbishop of York and Lord Chancellor of England.

Sources

See also
 Baron Grey de Wilton
 Baron Grey of Codnor
 Baron Grey de Ruthyn
 Gray's Inn

References

External links
Greys Court in Oxfordshire
Origin of the Name Anchetil

1050s births

Year of birth uncertain
Year of death unknown
Anglo-Normans
Norman warriors
People from Rotherfield Greys
Anchetil de Grey